Ragavardhini (pronounced rāgavardini) has two separate meanings in Indian classical music:

 a major part of the alapana of a raga. The performer gives a step-by-step elaboration of the raga, pausing at each major note or swara.
 the 32nd melakarta raga  in the Katapayadi sankhya scheme of Carnatic music.

Melakarta 
It is the 32nd melakarta rāgam in the 72 melakarta rāgam system of Carnatic music. It is called Rāgachudāmaṇi in Muthuswami Dikshitar school of Carnatic music.

Structure and Lakshana

It is the 2nd rāgam in the 6th chakra Ritu. The mnemonic name is Ritu-Sri. The mnemonic phrase is sa ru gu ma pa dha ni. Its  structure is as follows (see swaras in Carnatic music for details on below notation and terms):
: 
: 

The notes in this scale are shatsruthi rishabham, antara gandharam, shuddha madhyamam, shuddha dhaivatham and kaisiki nishadham. As it is a melakarta, by definition it is a sampurna rāga (has all seven notes in ascending and descending scale). It is the shuddha madhyamam equivalent of Jyoti swarupini, which is the 68th melakarta scale.

Janya rāgas 
Ragavardini has a few minor janya rāgas (derived scales) associated with it. See List of janya rāgas for full list of rāgas associated with Ragavardini.

Film Songs

Language:Tamil

Janya Ragam: Swaravardhini

Related rāgas
This section covers the theoretical and scientific aspect of this rāga.

Ragavardini's notes when shifted using Graha bhedam, yields Varunapriya melakarta rāga, when the shift of Tonic note is to the madhyamam. See further details and an illustration at Graha bhedam on Ragavardini.

Notes

References

Carnatic music terminology
Melakarta ragas